Lists of Test cricketers are lists of Test cricket players.

By team 
 List of Afghanistan Test cricketers
 List of Australia Test cricketers
 List of Bangladesh Test cricketers
 List of England Test cricketers
 List of India Test cricketers
 List of Ireland Test cricketers
 List of New Zealand Test cricketers
 List of Pakistan Test cricketers
 List of South Africa Test cricketers
 List of Sri Lanka Test cricketers
 List of West Indies Test cricketers
 List of World XI Test cricketers
 List of Zimbabwe Test cricketers

By matches played 
 List of cricketers who have played 100 Tests

See also
 Lists of One Day International cricketers
 Lists of Twenty20 International cricketers

Tests